Chris Bosse is a German-born architect, resident in Sydney in Australia. He was a designer of the Beijing National Aquatics Centre, which was built for the 2008 Summer Olympics.

Life 
Chris Bosse was born on 30 September 1971 in Stuttgart to an architect named Wolfgang Bosse. His brother Jan Bosse became a theater director while Bosse followed in his father's footsteps and studied architecture, first in Berlin and Cologne and later at EPFL in Lausanne. Shortly after his studies he moved to Sydney and started working as an associate architect for PTW, where he was one of the leading designers of the Beijing National Aquatics Centre that was built for the 2008 Summer Olympics. 

Bosse won an Emerging Architect Award from RIBA in London in 2008, 2012 the prestigious 40 under 40 award for emerging designers in Asia, as well as the Australian Design Honor Award at the Australian Design Center in Sidney in 2015.

In 2007 Bosse founded L-A-V-A (Laboratory for Visionary Architecture) with Tobias Walliser and Alexander Rieck.

Since 2010 Bosse has worked as an Adjunct Professor and Research Innovation fellow at the University of Technology Sydney (UTS) in Australia.

Influences 
Bosse has based his work on the computational study of organic structures and resulting spatial conceptions. In his practice, he often uses the practice of biomimetics. His research lies in the exploration of unusual structures pushing the boundaries of the traditional understanding of structure and architecture with digital and experimental form finding. The potential for naturally evolving systems such as snowflakes, spider webs and soap bubbles for new building typologies and structures informs Bosse’s work.

Works

Laboratory for Visionary Architecture (LAVA) 
Chris is one of 3 Co-Founders of the Laboratory for Visionary Architecture (LAVA) and Tobias Wallisser and Alexander Rieck. LAVA has offices in Sydney, Stuttgart, Berlin and Vietnam.  

LAVA is an international think tank set up in 2007 with a focus on research and design. Its stated goal is to reposition architecture at the forefront of cultural, technological and social change.

On 7 October 2008 at Dubai cityscape, Formula 1 driver Michael Schumacher and LAVA presented the design for The Michael Schumacher World Champion Tower (MSWCT), the first in a series of seven towers to be built worldwide.
"The Tower marks a departure from traditional architectural thinking", state the architects Chris Bosse and Tobias Wallisser.
“Inspired by the geometrical order of a snowflake and the aerodynamics of a Formula 1 racing car, the tower encapsulates speed, fluid dynamics, future technology and natural patterns of organization”.

LAVA architects won the bid to design the city center for the sustainable eco-city Masdar in the United Arab Emirates (UAE) in 2010.  LAVA imagined an outdoor city-centre based on traditional European public plazas that would encourage social interaction. However, Masdar’s arid climate leaves outdoor spaces subject to the heat of the desert. To ameliorate this problem and create a comfortable place to gather and shop, the architects incorporated adaptive building technologies,  The project for the city centre includes a plaza, hotel, convention centre, entertainment and retail facilities. Masdar centre won the Special Award - Environmental Category in the 2009 Cityscape Dubai Awards.

LAVA’s Digital Origami Tigers are travelled the world as part of the WWF year of the tiger campaign.

Tower Skin: Zeroprize winning speculative proposal  for the UTS building in Sydney, re-purposes an inefficient and outdated building.

Other work 
Other projects include the architectural installation 'Green Void', in Sydney, furniture including Sherman Bibliotheca, Sydney, office screens for Schiavello and a desk light ‘Evolution’ for Wallpaper* and ‘Light Void’ for Artemide; the MTV Awards set in Sydney; Myer fashion show set; an origami emergency shelter; and a planned futuristic residence on a Beijing rooftop. LAVA's Martian Embassy in Sydney houses shop and writing classes for children in an immersive space of oscillating plywood ribs integrating seating, counters, and shelves and animated by red planet light and sound projections. LAVA won [with DESIGNSPORT and JDAW] the international competition held by the Federal Sport Commission, Ethiopia, to design a new FIFA and Olympic-standard 60,000-seat stadium and sports village in Addis Ababa. Construction commenced in 2014.

In 2012 Bosse won the '40 Under 40 Award' that recognizes rising design stars under 40.

References

External links
 LAVA website
 Digital Origami Exhibition 2007
 Interview on website of Cologne University
 Keynote address in Kuala Lumpur2004
 Chris on Poloxygen magazine

20th-century German architects
1971 births
Living people
21st-century German architects
Architects from Stuttgart